The 13th Parliament of Jamaica was sworn in after being elected at the 2016 Jamaican general election.

Members

References 

21st-century Jamaican politicians
Parliament of Jamaica
2010s in Jamaica